Peyton Randolph (1779December 26, 1828) was a Democratic-Republican politician from Virginia who served as acting Governor of Virginia for several days at the end of 1811 and beginning of 1812.

Biography
Randolph was the son of Edmund Jennings Randolph, who had been a delegate to the Continental Congress, Governor of Virginia, and the first U.S. Attorney General. He was born in Williamsburg, Virginia in 1779, graduated from the College of William and Mary in 1798, studied law, and practiced in Richmond.

He served on the Virginia Privy Council from 1809 to 1812. Following the death of Governor George William Smith and 68 others in the Richmond Theatre fire on December 26, 1811, Randolph served as the Acting Governor of Virginia, from December 26, 1811, until January 3, 1812.

For many years Randolph was clerk of the  Virginia Supreme Court of Appeals. He was the court's official reporter from 1821 until his death and produced the Virginia Reports, the court's official published case records.

He died in Richmond on December 26, 1828.

References 

Political Graveyard

1779 births
1828 deaths
Governors of Virginia
Peyton Randolph
American people of English descent
College of William & Mary alumni
Virginia Democratic-Republicans
Democratic-Republican Party state governors of the United States
Politicians from Williamsburg, Virginia
19th-century American politicians